Fritz Hermann Goerdeler (6 March 1886 – 1 March 1945) was a German jurist and resistance fighter.	

Goerdeler was born as the younger brother of Carl Friedrich Goerdeler in Schneidemühl (today Piła, Poland) and grew up in Marienwerder, where his father had taken office as a judge at the local court in 1890. Goerdeler studied law and worked as a lawyer. In 1920 he became the mayor of Marienwerder and was reelected in 1932, however he was forced to leave this position in 1933 after he refused to join the Nazi Party.

Goerdeler became the municipal chamberlain of Königsberg in 1934 until 1944 and joined the German resistance movement against the Nazis. He had close contact to the military resistance especially in East Prussia.

Goerdeler was imprisoned after the failed 20 July plot and sentenced to death by the Volksgerichtshof on 23 February 1945. He was hanged at Plötzensee Prison on 1 March 1945.

Goerdeler was married and had three daughters and a son.

References

Further reading
Schultze, Harald; Kurschat, Andreas, eds.  (2008): „Ihr Ende schaut an …“ – Evangelische Märtyrer des 20. Jahrhunderts. 2., erw. u. verb. Aufl. Evangelische Verlagsanstalt, Leipzig, p. 282 f

1886 births
1945 deaths
People from Piła
People from Kwidzyn
People from the Province of Posen
German conservatives in the German Resistance
Protestants in the German Resistance
People executed by hanging at Plötzensee Prison
Executed members of the 20 July plot